Casablanca ("White House" in Spanish) is a city in Morocco.

Casablanca or Casa Blanca may also refer to:

Places

United States
Casa Blanca, Arizona, a census-designated place in Arizona
Casa Blanca, California, a neighborhood in Riverside, California
Casa Blanca, New Mexico, an unincorporated community in Cibola County, New Mexico
Casa Blanca, Puerto Rico, a house museum in San Juan
Casa Blanca, Texas, an incorporated community in Texas
Casa Blanca, Starr County, Texas
Lake Casa Blanca near Laredo, Texas

Other countries
Casablanca (volcano) a volcano in southern Chile
Casablanca, Chile, a municipality in the region of Valparaiso
Casablanca Valley, a wine region in Chile
Casablanca, Havana, a suburb of Havana, Cuba
Camp Casablanca, a military base in Kosovo
Grand Casablanca, a region in Morocco which includes the city of Casablanca
Universidad Casa Blanca, a private university in Culiacán, Sinaloa, Mexico

Arts, entertainment, and media

Music

Groups and labels
Casablanca (band), a Swedish group
"Casablanca", a song by Bertie Higgins from Just Another Day in Paradise
"Casablanca", a song by Emarosa from This Is Your Way Out
"Casablanca", a song by Jessica Jay from Broken Hearted Woman
 "Casablanca", a song by Markus Feehily from Fire
"Casablanca", a song by "Two Steps From Hell"
 Casablanca (album), album by The Saints
Bümpliz – Casablanca, an album by Züri West
Casablanca Records, a record label

Television
Casablanca (1955 TV series), an American television series
Casablanca (1983 TV series), an American television series
"Casablanca" (Get Smart), an episode of Get Smart

Other uses in arts, entertainment, and media
Casablanca (film), a 1942 film starring Ingrid Bergman and Humphrey Bogart
Casablanca (novella), a 2006 novella based on the film
Pirate Submarine, a 1951 French film originally titled Casablanca
Kasablanka (2019 film), a 2019 Egyptian film starring Ghada Adel, Amir Karara and Eyad Nassar

People with the name
David Casablanca, professional soccer player
Ted Casablanca, American entertainment journalist

Ships
Casablanca-class escort carriers, ships deployed by the Allies during World War II
USS Casablanca (CVE-55)

Sports
Raja Casablanca, a Moroccan professional football club
Wydad Casablanca, a Moroccan sports club

Other uses
Casa Blanca Case, arbitrated by Louis Renault in 1909
 Casablanca (beer), a Moroccan beer brand
Casablanca Conference, a 1943 conference to plan the European strategy of the Allies during World War II
Casablanca directive, a World War II Allied aerial bombing directive issued shortly after the Casablanca Conference
Casablanca Fan Company, a ceiling fan company
Casablanca Group, a defunct organization of progressive states

See also
Casabianca (disambiguation)
Casablancas, a surname
Chazablanca, an album by Chaz Jankel
José Raúl Capablanca, Cuban Chess player
White House, official residence of the U.S. President
White House (disambiguation)
Whitehouse (disambiguation)